The Rally of Congolese Ecologist-The Greens (or REC- LES VERTS) is a Green party in the Democratic Republic of the Congo. It was founded by Faustin Kiembwa Tabena on June 15, 2001.

In the 2006 general elections, a REC-LES VERTS candidate for the National Assembly, Mpaka Mawete Ruffin, gained the single-member seat of Kimvula in Bas-Congo.

See also 

Conservation movement
Environmental movement
Green party
Green politics
List of environmental organizations
Sustainability
Sustainable development

External links
 Last archive of party's website

Green parties in Africa
Political parties in the Democratic Republic of the Congo